The , officially called , is a daily newspaper in the Philippines written in the Japanese language. Established in May 1992 as a broadsheet, it is Southeast Asia's first modern-day daily Japanese-language newspaper. Although the newspaper is written primarily in Japanese, it also has a section in English.

The newspaper and its journalists have won several awards for its news articles or other works based on their experiences while on assignment. The newspaper also has a history of community outreach, particularly to non-Japanese-speaking Filipinos, through the Daily Manila Shimbun Culture Center. It began organizing an annual cooking festival in 1998, as well as a Filipino-language essay writing contest in 2002. In 2014, the newspaper signed a memorandum of agreement with the Tourism Promotions Board, an attached agency of the Department of Tourism, to promote Japanese tourism to the Philippines through media placements both in the Manila Shimbun and its sister magazines.

The print edition of the newspaper was discontinued in December 2021 due to the COVID-19 pandemic in the Philippines, leaving the online edition as its sole format, although the print edition resumed production on October 1, 2022.

References

External links

Japanese-language newspapers
Daily newspapers published in the Philippines
National newspapers published in the Philippines
Newspapers published in Metro Manila